Hove was a non-metropolitan district in East Sussex, England. It was abolished on 1 April 1997 and replaced by Brighton and Hove.

Political control
From the first election to the council in 1973 until its abolition in 1997 political control of the council was held by the following parties:

Leadership
The last leader of the council, Ivor Caplin, who had led the council from 1995, went on to be the first deputy leader of the replacement authority, Brighton and Hove City Council, and was also elected as the Member of Parliament for the Hove constituency the month after the council's abolition.

Council elections
1973 Hove Borough Council election
1976 Hove Borough Council election
1979 Hove Borough Council election (New ward boundaries)
1983 Hove Borough Council election
1987 Hove Borough Council election
1991 Hove Borough Council election
1995 Hove Borough Council election (Borough boundary changes took place but the number of seats remained the same)

Borough result maps

By-election results

References

External links

 
Council elections in East Sussex
District council elections in England
Hove